Louis Magnus (25 May 1881 in Kingston, Jamaica – 1 November 1950) was a Jamaican-French competitive figure skater, representing France, and an ice hockey executive. He is considered as the builder of the International Ice Hockey Federation (IIHF).

Born in Jamaica, Magnus moved to France in 1889.

Magnus competed as a figure skater in the disciplines of single skating and pair skating in France. He was the 1908–1911 French national champion in singles, and the 1912 national champion in pairs with partner Anita Del Monte. He worked as a figure skating judge for France at many international events. 

A member of the group that founded the IIHF, he served as its inaugural president from 1908 to 1912, and again in 1914.

He wrote Les sports d'hiver with Renaud de la Fregeolière in 1911.

In 1997, he was inducted in the IIHF Hall of Fame.

The French ice hockey league, the Ligue Magnus, and its trophy, the Coupe Magnus, are named after him. The headquarters of the IIHF in Zurich are named "Villa Louis Magnus", also after him.

References
 French Figure Skating Championships: Historical Podium

1881 births
1950 deaths
French male single skaters
French male pair skaters
International Ice Hockey Federation executives
IIHF Hall of Fame inductees
Sportspeople from Kingston, Jamaica
Emigrants from British Jamaica to France